The 9th Illinois Cavalry Regiment was a cavalry regiment that served in the Union Army during the American Civil War.

Service
The  9th Illinois Cavalry was mustered into service at Chicago, Illinois, on November 30, 1861.

The regiment was mustered out on October 31, 1865, at Selma, Alabama.

Future governor of Minnesota Samuel Rinnah Van Sant served in the regiment, as did future Nebraska governor Albinus Nance and future Wisconsin legislator Stewart J. Bailey.

Total strength and casualties
One officer and 45 enlisted men were killed in action or died of their wounds, and 6 officers and 241 enlisted men who died of disease, for a total of 293 fatalities.

Commanders
Colonel Albert G. Brackett - mustered out on October 26, 1864
Colonel Joseph W. Harper - mustered out with the regiment.

See also
9th Illinois Mounted Infantry regiment
List of Illinois Civil War Units
Illinois in the American Civil War

Notes

References
The Civil War Archive

Units and formations of the Union Army from Illinois
1861 establishments in Illinois
Military units and formations established in 1861
Military units and formations disestablished in 1865